Qingyan is a town in Huaxi District of Guiyang, Guizhou, China. It is surrounded by Yanlou Township and Maling Township on the west, Qiantao Township on the east, and Huishui County on the south. Eleven ethnic groups, including Han, Miao, Bouyei, Dong and Zhuang, live in the town.

Etymology
The name, Qingyan, comes from an ancient book named New Records of Guizhou Illustrated Classics.

History
In early Ming dynasty (1368–1644), Qingyan was a military outpost. In the Tianqi period (1621–1627) of the Ming dynasty, Ban Lingui, a Bouyei tusi, founded a castle. In 1572, Qingyansi was set up.

In 1687, in the 26th year of Kangxi era (1662–1722) of the Qing dynasty (1644–1911), Qingyan came under the jurisdiction of Guizhu County.

In 1914, Qingyan was incorporated as a town. In 1931, Qingyan upgraded to a district. In 1941, Qingyan was under the jurisdiction of Yanlou District of Guizhou County.

After the establishment of the Communist State in 1949, the Second District was set up in the town. In 1953, it was reverted to its former name of "Qingyan Town". In 1958, it was changed to a People's Commune. In 1984, Qingyan was renamed "Qingyan Township" and two years later it was reverted to its former name of "Qingyan Town". In 2016, it was listed as the first batch of "Small Towns with Chinese Characteristics" by the Ministry of Housing and Urban-Rural Development. On February 25, 2017, it was rated as a National 5A Tourist Attraction.

Administrative division
As of 2017, the town is divided into seventeen villages and two communities: 
 Ming Qing Street Community  
 East Street Community  
 South Street  
 West Street  
 North Street  
 Waijiao  
 Shanwangmiao  
 Baituo  
 Yangmei  
 Baizao  
 Xinshao  
 Siqian  
 Dahang  
 Gutong  
 Xinlou  
 Erguan  
 Daba  
 Longjing  
 Xinguan

Geography

Climate

Qingyan River, Yangmei River and Zhaosi River flow through the town.

Economy
Tourism is the main source of local income.

Transport
National Highway G210 passes across the town.

Attractions
The town has many historic buildings, including the Former Residence of Zhao Yijiong, Ancestral Hall of Marshal Zhao, Wenchang Pavilion, Longevity Palace, North Gate, and Dingguang Gate.

References

Towns in Guizhou